BABY BRASA is an organic Peruvian group of restobars and catering service based in New York City, founded in 2016 by restaurateur, television personality and singer Franco Noriega. Baby Brasa is currently owned by Milan Kelez, who also serves as entertainment director and leads the front of the house at Baby Brasa. Milan Kelez is active on the New York social scene and is said to be capable of pulling in serious starpower. The two-story flagship location in the West Village serves contemporary Peruvian cuisine, fusion dishes, and signature cocktails. The West Village location is also an entertainment venue with weekly live music performances. The company's first location opened as a small eatery in the Lower East Side, later expanding to the West Village.

References

Restaurants in Manhattan
2016 establishments in New York City